David Willardson is an American artist.

He attended the Art Center College of Design. He has worked on Disney characters, designing a "new look" for many of Disney's movie posters, and worked on Disney movie campaigns for 17 years.

As an award-winning illustrator in the 1970s, Willardson was instrumental in the rise of airbrush art in pop culture, leading to a prolific career in illustration and design. His work includes the covers of Jerry Lee Lewis' There Must Be More to Love Than This (1970), the soundtrack album for American Graffiti (1973), Little Richard's The Second Coming (1972) and the Refreshments' Fizzy Fuzzy Big & Buzzy (1996), as well as Rolling Stone magazine cover art and the Fender guitar poster series.

Willardson is a "pep" artist.

References 

Living people
Film poster artists
Year of birth missing (living people)
Album-cover and concert-poster artists
Art Center College of Design alumni